Murder Among Friends is a 1941 American mystery film directed by Ray McCarey and written by John Larkin. The film stars Marjorie Weaver, John Hubbard, Cobina Wright, Mona Barrie, Douglass Dumbrille and Sidney Blackmer. The film was released on February 28, 1941, by 20th Century Fox.

Plot

Cast   
Marjorie Weaver as Mary Lou
John Hubbard as Dr. Thomas Wilson
Cobina Wright as Jessica Gerald
Mona Barrie as Clair Turk
Douglass Dumbrille as Carter Stevenson
Sidney Blackmer as Mr. Wheeler
Truman Bradley as McAndrews
Lucien Littlefield as Dr. Fred Turk
William Halligan as Dr. James Gerald 
Donald Douglas as Ellis
Eddie Conrad as Proprietor
Milton Parsons as Douglass

References

External links 
 

1941 films
20th Century Fox films
American mystery films
1941 mystery films
Films directed by Ray McCarey
American black-and-white films
1940s English-language films
1940s American films